Simon Andreas Larsen (born 1 June 1988) is a retired Norwegian football defender.

Club career 
He played for the Norwegian team Vindbjart from 2011.

In 2012, he signed for Norwegian team Vålerenga. He made his debut on 10 April 2012 against Viking, they won the game 1-0.

Larsen signed with FK Jerv on 21 December 2018. He retired in 2021.

Career statistics

References

External links
 
 

1988 births
Living people
Sportspeople from Kristiansand
Norwegian footballers
Vindbjart FK players
Vålerenga Fotball players
Hønefoss BK players
IK Start players
FK Jerv players
Eliteserien players
Norwegian First Division players
Association football defenders